Penicuik is a town and former burgh in Midlothian, Scotland, lying on the west bank of the River North Esk. It lies on the A701 midway between Edinburgh and Peebles, east of the Pentland Hills.

Name
The town's name is pronounced 'Pennycook' and is derived from Pen Y Cog, meaning "Hill of the Cuckoo" in the Old Brythonic language (also known as Ancient British and the forerunner of modern Welsh).

History

In 1296, Thomas Rymer's Foedera mentions a "Walter Edgar a person of Penicok south of Edenburgh", which logically can only be what is now called Penicuik. Penycook appears as the name on John Adair's map of 1682 and the ruined old parish church, in the centre of the graveyard, dates from the late 17th century.

Penicuik became home to an early paper mill, Valleyfield Mill, which was established by Agnes Campbell in 1709.

The Pomathorn Bridge was a toll bridge across the River Esk and the main route between Edinburgh to the north and the Scottish Borders to the south. "The Young Pretender", Charles Edward Stuart, is recorded as having crossed the River Esk on his march south on 8 November 1745.

The town was expanded as a planned village, roughly based on Edinburgh's New Town, by Sir James Clerk, 3rd Baronet of Penicuik in 1770.

Glencorse Barracks, which is home to the Royal Highland Fusiliers, 2nd Battalion The Royal Regiment of Scotland, was established as a facility for incarcerating French prisoners of war during the Napoleonic Wars and was originally known as Greenlaw Military Prison when it was completed in 1803. Charles Cowan, who acquired Valleyfield Mill in 1779, sold it to the War Office in order to create additional prisoner of war facilities in 1811. In 1830, Alexander Cowan erected a monument, designed by Thomas Hamilton, to the memory of 309 prisoners who died in the prisoner of war camps.

Penicuik hosted the inaugural Grand Match in curling, between the north and the south of Scotland, in 1847. This took place on the "high pond" on the estate of Penicuik House, not the "low pond" which is still used for curling on rare occasions.

The town, whilst generally architecturally undistinguished, contains two masterpieces by Frederick Thomas Pilkington: the South Church (originally the United Free Church, of 1862; and the flamboyant "Park End" houses on Bridge Street also of 1862.

Following population growth, largely associated with the paper mills, the town became a burgh in 1866.

In 1889, a fire at the Mauricewood Colliery resulted in the death of 63 men and boys, with only seven survivors. Its owners, The Schotts Iron Company, closed the pit following the disaster. 

The Cowan Institute, now known as Penicuik Town Hall, was funded by the Cowan family and designed by Campbell Douglas in 1893.

The Penicuik war memorial was designed by Sir Robert Lorimer and dates from 1920.

The Dalmore paper mill on the North Esk river at Auchendinny closed in 2004.

Schools
There are five primary schools in Penicuik, Cuiken Primary, Cornbank St James Primary, Sacred Heart Primary (Roman Catholic), Strathesk Primary and Mauricewood Primary. There are also two high schools, Penicuik High School and Beeslack High School (which is soon to move out of Penicuik itself).

Climate
Penicuik experiences a maritime climate with cool summers and mild winters. The town's somewhat elevated position (180 m O.S.) means it is more susceptible to snowfall than nearby Edinburgh; over 30 days of the year on average reported lying snow between 1951 and 1980, compared to 14 at Edinburgh. The coldest temperature in recent years was  during January 2010.

Demography

Its population at the 2011 census was 15,930 computed according to the 2010 definition of the locality.

Radio
Crystal FM is the Community Radio Station serving Penicuik & S W Midlothian on 107.4FM.

In popular culture
Near Penicuik is Glencorse Parish Kirk, which formed part of the inspiration for Robert Louis Stevenson's Weir of Hermiston.

Notable people

Notable people connected with Penicuik include;

Jim Aitken, Scotland rugby union captain
Tommy Banner, lead singer from The Wurzels
Helen Bannerman, writer
Joseph Bell FRCSE, surgeon and lecturer at the medical school of the University of Edinburgh
Agnes Borrowman, first woman to serve on the Pharmaceutical Society's Board of Examiners. 
Sir John Clerk, baronet, composer and leading Scottish politician during the period leading up to the 1707 Act of Union 
Alexander Cowan, papermaker and philanthropist
Charles Cowan, papermaker and MP for Edinburgh
James Cowan, Liberal Party politician
James Cowan, cricketer
Sir John Cowan, 1st Baronet of Beeslack, papermaker and chairman of the Midlothian Liberal Association
Samuel Rutherford Crockett, novelist
Claire Emslie, footballer
James Cossar Ewart, FRS, zoologist
James Finlayson, industrialist
Sir James Hamilton, Aircraft designer who led the British Concorde development team
Jason Kerr, footballer
Cargill Gilston Knott, FRS, mathematician and seismologist
Sam Nicholson, footballer
Sir Geoff Palmer, scientist and human rights activist
Craig Paterson, footballer
Charles Thomson Rees Wilson, Nobel Prize-winning physicist, was born at a nearby farm

Twin town
 L'Isle-sur-la-Sorgue in the region of Provence.
 Midlothian, Chicago (along with all other towns in Midlothian, Scotland).

Gallery

References

 
Towns in Midlothian
Burghs
Papermaking in the United Kingdom
Populated places established in 1770
1770 establishments in Scotland